Donna Marcantonio is an American artist. Her work is included in the collections of the Whitney Museum of American Art and the RISD Museum.

References

Living people
American artists
American women artists
Year of birth missing (living people)
21st-century American women